Prof. Dato Sri Dr. Sim Kui Hian (born 18 August 1965) is a Malaysian politician and cardiologist who is serving as the Deputy Premier of Sarawak and the territory's Minister of Public Health, Housing and Local Government Sarawak in the Gabungan Parti Sarawak (GPS) administration under Premier Abang Abdul Rahman Johari Abang Openg since January 2022, as well as an elected representative for the constituency of N14 Batu Kawah in the Sarawak State Legislative Assembly (DUN) since May 2016.

Dr. Sim is Sarawak's first deputy premier (a title formerly known as deputy chief minister) of Chinese descent in more than a decade after George Chan Hong Nam stepped down in 2011. Previously, he served as the Minister of Local Government Sarawak from May 2016 to January 2017 under the late Adenan Satem's cabinet, and Minister of Local Government and Housing Sarawak from January 2017 to December 2021 under Abang Johari's first cabinet. He also had served as Senator in the Parliament of Malaysia from April 2014 to April 2017.

Additionally, he holds a watching brief role which gives him oversight over several Malaysian federal government departments operating in the territory, namely the Sarawak Health Department and the Sarawak Fire and Rescue Department.

He is a member of the Sarawak United Peoples' Party (SUPP), which he is the Party President since September 2014. He is also one of the founding Vice-Chairmen of the GPS coalition, in which SUPP is a co-founding component party.

While acknowledging that Sarawak is part of Malaysia, Dr. Sim is one of the most vocal and consistent proponents for more Sarawakian autonomous power and rights, based on the unique contexts of the Malaysia's formation as originally outlined in the Malaysia Agreement 1963 (MA63), Inter-Governmental Committee (IGC) Report and recommendations, and the Report of the Cobbold Commission.

Background 
The son of the late Tan Sri Datuk Amar Sim Kheng Hong who was the Deputy Chief Minister of Sarawak from 1974 to 1991, Dr. Sim was no stranger to Sarawakian politics since his childhood. He received his primary education at Chung Hua Primary School No.4 and his secondary education in St. Joseph's Secondary School, Kuching. After that, he completed his Higher School Certificate at St. Bede's College in Mentone, Victoria, Australia. He subsequently graduated with an MBBS from Monash University's Alfred Medical School and completed his cardiology fellowship at Monash Medical Centre in Melbourne.

Nonetheless, his father's personal values and passion in public service had rubbed-off on his character, and a chance to serve his homeland came when Dr. Sim found out that the Sarawak General Hospital (SGH) was attempting to set up a cardiology unit. He soon left his practice and returned in 1998, after spending 17 years in Australia. In 2001, the Cardiology Department of SGH was set up. The department had progressively evolved into a cardiology centre (SGH Heart Centre, which later renamed Sarawak Heart Centre) with its own standalone facilities in Kota Samarahan and a recognised training centre for cardiothoracic surgeons. He started public service with the Ministry of Health Malaysia in 1998 at Grade U2 (equivalent to current Grade U48 today). He climbed public service ranks within the Ministry of Health to Grade JUSA C by age 37, and eventually to JUSA A (age 43) between 2003 and 2009, and after transitioning the leadership at the heart centre, Dr. Sim went on to active politics. His maiden contest for public office was in the 2011 Sarawak Elections which he lost. Five years later, he contested and won in the 2016 Sarawak Elections. Dr. Sim has a special background pertaining to Sarawak-China relations. In 1974, then Prime Minister of Malaysia Tun Abdul Razak and Dr Sim's late father, Tan Sri Datuk Amar Sim Kheng Hong (who was with Deputy Chief of Mission Tun Jugah representing Sarawak in the delegation), were among the people who helped establish the foundations of Malaysia-China bilateral relationship.

Personal life
Dr. Sim is married to Datin Sri associate professor Enn Ong since 1991 and they have two sons.

Unlike most doctor-turned-politicians who stopped practising medicine, Dr. Sim currently still holds a medical practising license and specialist license, and still makes frequent visits to the Sarawak General Hospital (SGH)'s Sarawak Heart Centre as a visiting senior consultant cardiologist. Having spent over 10 years as the inaugural head at the SGH Department of Cardiology (the third public cardiac centre by the Ministry of Health Malaysia) and subsequently as the inaugural head of its Clinical Research Centre (CRC), Dr. Sim is today the advisor at SGH CRC and advisor at the National Heart Association of Malaysia.  He is also a board member of Clinical Research Malaysia (CRM), as well as an adjunct professor at the Faculty of Medicine & Health Science, Universiti Malaysia Sarawak (UNIMAS).

He is also a member in the Expert Writing Panel for Clinical Practise Guidelines on management in cardiovascular disease in Malaysia; a task force member of the International Commission on Radiological Protection (ICRP) on radiation protection in cardiology; and a member of International Atomic Energy Agency (IAEA)’s Expert Panel on Radiological Protection of Patients.

He is still active in professional conferences and research. Between 1996 and 2015, he participated as either a faculty member or speaker for more than 200 professional meetings in the US, Europe and Asian-Pacific; made over 200 scientific abstract presentations; over 50 scientific publications (including NEJM); and over 125 clinical trials as a principal investigator.

Other professional positions he holds include: the immediate past president, Asian Pacific Society of Cardiology (APSC); international governor steering committee (Asia Pacific region) of the American College of Cardiology; board member of World Heart Federation; executive committee member of the Asian Society of Cardiac Imaging (ASCI); council member and past president of the National Heart Association of Malaysia (NHAM); and the past secretary general of the Asian Pacific Society of Interventional Cardiology (APSIC). His research interests include cardiac CT, cardiac MRI, metabolic syndrome and ACS biomarkers in the multi-ethic Asian community. He is a principal investigator/steering committee member in more than 100 multicentre clinical studies in Malaysia.

Professional Credentials 
 Fellow of Royal Australasian College of Physicians (FRACP – Cardiology)
 Fellow of American College of Cardiology (FACC)
 Fellow of Society of Cardiovascular Angiography & Intervention, USA (FSCAI)
 Fellow of Cardiac Society of Australia & New Zealand (FCSANZ)
 Fellow of European Society of Cardiology (FESC)
 Fellow of Asian Pacific Society of Interventional Cardiology (FAPSIC)
 Fellow of ASEAN College of Cardiology (FAsCC)
 Fellow of National Heart Association of Malaysia (FNHAM)
 Fellow of American Heart Association (FAHA)
 Fellow of College of Asia Pacific Society of Cardiology (FCAPSC)
 Fellow of Academy of Medicine Malaysia (FAMM)

Election results

Honours 
  :
  Commander of the Order of Meritorious Service (PJN) – Datuk (2014)

  :
  Knight Commander of the Order of the Star of Sarawak (PNBS) - Dato Sri (2019)

References 

1964 births
Living people
People from Sarawak
Malaysian politicians of Chinese descent
Malaysian people of Hakka descent
Malaysian cardiologists
Sarawak United Peoples' Party politicians
Members of the Sarawak State Legislative Assembly
Members of the Dewan Negara
Monash University alumni
Fellows of the American College of Cardiology
Commanders of the Order of Meritorious Service
Knights Commander of the Most Exalted Order of the Star of Sarawak